The first Shorty Awards ceremony was held on February 11, 2009, at the Galapagos Art Space in Brooklyn, New York. Approximately 300 people attended the event. The event was hosted by CNN anchor Rick Sanchez and featured appearances by prominent Twitter users MC Hammer and Gary Vaynerchuk and a video appearance by Shaquille O'Neal. The awards, in 26 categories, were voted on by Twitter users.

History 
The Shorty Awards were created in 2008 by tech entrepreneurs Greg Galant, Adam Varga, and Lee Semel of Sawhorse Media. They invited Twitter account holders to nominate the best Twitter users in general categories such as humor, news, food, and design. Winners were chosen by more than 30,000 Twitter users during the voting period. The founders of Twitter first heard about the awards after the contest had gotten underway and expressed support for it.

Winners 
The first annual winners by category:

References 

Shorty Awards
Awards established in 2008
2009 in Internet culture